EKA ( a short form of Embedded Karmarkar Algorithm, which also means the number One in Sanskrit.  ), is a supercomputer built by the Computational Research Laboratories, a company founded by Dr. Narendra Karmarkar, for scaling up a supercomputer architecture he designed at the Tata Institute of Fundamental Research with a group of his students and project assistants over a period of 6 years.

CRL became a subsidiary of Tata Sons, after their investment into the company. The hardware platform required for initial software development was built with technical assistance from Hewlett-Packard.

Design 

To enable design of new software, previously proven hardware platform was needed. This was provided in the EKA system using 14,352 cores based on the Intel QuadCore Xeon processors. The primary interconnect is Infiband 4x DDR. EKA occupies about  area.It was built using offshelf components from Hewlett-Packard, Mellanox and Voltaire Limited. It was built within a short period of 6 weeks.

Ranking history 

At the time of its unveiling, it was the fourth-fastest supercomputer in the world and the fastest in Asia.

See also 

 SAGA-220, a 220-TeraFLOPS supercomputer built by ISRO
 PARAM  series of supercomputers by the Centre for Development of Advanced Computing
 Supercomputing in India

References

External links 
 Eka Top 500 Supercomputer list    
 Computational Research Laboratories
 TCS acquires Computational Research Laboratories

X86 supercomputers
Hewlett-Packard supercomputers
Information technology in India
Supercomputing in India